In mathematics, the Sims conjecture is a result in group theory, originally proposed by Charles Sims.

The conjecture was proven by Peter Cameron, Cheryl Praeger, Jan Saxl, and Gary Seitz using the classification of finite simple groups, in particular the fact that only finitely many isomorphism types of sporadic groups exist.

The theorem reads precisely as follows.

Thus, in a primitive permutation group with "large" stabilizers, these stabilizers cannot have any small orbit.  A consequence of their proof is that there exist only finitely many connected distance-transitive graphs having degree greater than 2.

References 

Algebraic graph theory
Finite groups
Permutation groups
Theorems in graph theory
Theorems in group theory